The Barbados Jazz Festival was an annual music festival on the Caribbean island of Barbados. It was a week-long celebration held annually in January in Bridgetown.

The festival began in 1993. Acts who performed included James Blunt, Dwane Husbands, Kite, Glenn Lewis, Harvey Mason, Chrisette Michele, and Angie Stone. On 4 December ]2010, the producers of the festival announced that it would be cancelled for 2011 due to budgetary constraints.

See also
List of jazz festivals

References

Barbadian music
Arts festivals in Barbados
Jazz festivals in Barbados
Winter events in Barbados